Shawn Hasani Martin Henríquez (born 15 February 1987) is a former Salvadoran footballer who last played for A.D. Isidro Metapan.

Biography
His father, Eustace Martin, played professional baseball during the 1980s. His mother was Judy Henríquez. They both had lived in San Salvador. Due to hardships, his parents moved to San Salvador for a better future where his sister Mahatma Martin and his brother Harry Martin were born. At the age of 2, he moved to Nicaragua due to conflicts in the country at the time and since his aunt Carol Henriquez had lived in Santa Tecla, his aunt helped them out to start a new life. Eustace Martin had gone to the United States but never came back for Shawn's family. When Martin went to school, he practiced baseball but since baseball is not a big sport practiced in El Salvador, soccer began to be his favorite sport. Up to this day, neither he nor his family has returned to El Salvador. After a period of time he acquired Salvadoran citizenship in 2005.

Club career
At the age of 11, he went to C.D. Luis Ángel Firpo soccer academy and spent 6 years in the institution. At the age of only 17, he had his big break with C.D. Águila. He would become the first player since Vladan Vićević to be a naturalized footballer.

International career
Martin officially received his first cap on 13 October 2007 in a friendly match against Costa Rica. This game also saw him mark a goal on his debut, and since then, he has moved on to become a national team regular and participated in the majority of the games in the 2010 World Cup qualifiers.

As of August 2011, he has earned 31 caps, scoring four goals, and he has represented his country in 8 FIFA World Cup qualification matches and played at the 2009 UNCAF Nations Cup  as well as at the 2011 CONCACAF Gold Cup.

International goals

|-
| 1. || 13 October 2007 || Estadio Cuscatlán, San Salvador, El Salvador ||  || 2-2 || 2-2 || Friendly
|-
| 2. ||  6 February 2008 || Estadio Cuscatlán, San Salvador, El Salvador ||  || 1-0 || 12-0 || 2010 FIFA World Cup qualification
|-
| 3. || 6 February 2008 || Estadio Cuscatlán, San Salvador, El Salvador ||  || 2-0 || 12-0 || 2010 FIFA World Cup qualification
|-
| 4. || 10 September 2008 || André Kamperveen Stadion, Paramaribo, Suriname ||  || 1-0 || 2-0 || 2010 FIFA World Cup qualification
|}

References

External links
 El Gráfico Profile 

1987 births
Living people
Sportspeople from San Salvador
Association football defenders
Salvadoran footballers
El Salvador international footballers
2009 UNCAF Nations Cup players
2011 CONCACAF Gold Cup players
C.D. Águila footballers
Salvadoran people of Nicaraguan descent
Sportspeople from Managua